Khoobsurat is a 1999 Indian Hindi-language romantic comedy film directed by Sanjay Chhel and produced by Rahul Sughand. It stars Sanjay Dutt and Urmila Matondkar alongside an ensemble supporting cast. The film was declared an average at the box office.

Plot

The story revolves around con man Sanjay "Sanju" Shastri (Sanjay Dutt), who has a kind heart. He gets into a fight with Jogia Seth (Paresh Rawal), a smuggler whom he owes Rs. 50 lakhs. Sanju has to make the money in a month if he wants to save himself and Gudia, an orphan who becomes a hostage.

At this moment, Natwar (Johnny Lever) comes to Sanju's rescue. Natwar suggests that a way to get quick money is for Sanju to go into the Chaudhary household as "Sanju Shastri"  (whom the family has never met) and swindle the money from them.

As Sanju has no other choice, he decides to take his friends suggestion seriously and does manage to enter the Chaudhary Villa as their NRI relative. Sanju starts befriending the members of the Chaudhary family. The Chaudhary Parivar has three brothers who live together as an extended family- Dilip, Mahesh and Satish.

The eldest brother, Dilip (Om Puri), is an honest and kind man and takes care of the family and the entire family business.

Mahesh (Ashok Saraf) is the second brother, who is not so good at honesty or hard work, and he is a constant  gambler.

The third, Satish (Jatin Kanakia), has the habit of forgetting things and is absent-minded.

Shivani (Urmila Matondkar) is the daughter of Dilip, the eldest of the Chaudhary brothers. Shivani is beautiful, but without self-esteem or confidence, and this makes the whole family anxious about Shivani's marital prospects.

When Sanju comes on the scene, he wins everybody's hearts by solving their problems including the plain and boring Shivani. The rest of the film is about how Sanju transforms Shivani from a simple girl to a beautiful woman. And, in the process, unites the entire family and Shivani and Sanju fall in love. In an effort to escape, Sanju is caught stealing and trying to run away. In the end, Sanju defeats Jogia and they all live happily ever after.

Cast
 Sanjay Dutt — Sanjay Shastri (Sanju)
 Urmila Matondkar — Shivani Chaudhary 
 Paresh Rawal - Jogia Seth (Gangster)
 Om Puri — Dilip Chaudhary (Shivani's father)
 Farida Jalal — Sudha Chaudhary (Dadiji)
 Anjan Srivastav — Dinanath Chaudhary (Dadaji) 
 Ashok Saraf — Mahesh Chaudhary 
 Himani Shivpuri — Savita (Mahesh's wife)
 Jatin Kanakia — Satish Chaudhary 
 Supriya Pilgaonkar Ratna (Satish's wife)
 Johnny Lever — Natwar (Sanju's friend)
 Dinesh Hingoo
 Kashmera Shah as item number for Ghash Khake Ho Gaya
 Sophiya Haque as background dancer

The Songs "Ghoonghat Mein Chand Hoga" and "Mera Ek Sapna Hai" become huge hits.

Soundtrack

References

External links

1990s Hindi-language films
1999 films
Films scored by Jatin–Lalit